This is the results breakdown of the local elections held in the Balearic Islands on 3 April 1979. The following tables show detailed results in the autonomous community's most populous municipalities, sorted alphabetically.

Overall

City control
The following table lists party control in the most populous municipalities, including provincial capitals (shown in bold).

Municipalities

Calviá

Ciudadela
Population: 17,342

Ibiza
Population: 22,882

Inca
Population: 20,032

Lluchmayor
Population: 14,307

Mahón
Population: 21,576

Manacor
Population: 25,220

Palma
Population: 283,113

Santa Eulalia del Río
Population: 10,510

References

Balearic Islands
1979